Q150 was the sesquicentenary (150th anniversary) of the Separation of Queensland from New South Wales in 1859. Separation established the Colony of Queensland which became the State of Queensland in 1901 as part of the Federation of Australia. Q150 was celebrated in 2009.

Celebrations

The Queensland government and other Queensland organisations celebrated the occasion with many events and publications, including:
 announcement of the 150 icons of Queensland by the Queensland Premier Anna Bligh
 placement of a time capsule in the grounds of Old Government House
 the creation of monuments at significant survey points in Queensland's history by the Surveying and Spatial Sciences Institute to honour the many early explorer/surveyors who mapped the state
 the State Library of Queensland collected stories from notable Queenslanders, as part of the Storylines - Q150 digital stories project.

Many local communities celebrated Q150 in various ways. In Coominya, the local heritage society commissioned a series of murals depicting early life at the town.

See also
:Category:Q150 Icons

References

External links

  — Official website
 10085 Storylines - Q150 digital stories, 2009, John Oxley Library, State Library of Queensland
 Storylines Q150 digital stories: Treasure collection of the John Oxley Library, John Oxley Library Blog, State Library of Queensland.

Australian historical anniversaries
2009 in Australia
2000s in Queensland